The 2012 United States presidential election in Hawaii took place on November 6, 2012, as part of the 2012 United States presidential election in which all 50 states plus the District of Columbia participated. Hawaii voters chose four electors to represent them in the Electoral College via a popular vote pitting incumbent Democratic President Barack Obama and his running mate, Vice President Joe Biden, against Republican challenger and former Massachusetts Governor Mitt Romney and his running mate, Congressman Paul Ryan. 

Prior to the election, 17 news organizations considered this a state Obama would win, or otherwise considered as a safe blue state. The Hawaiian-born president handily won the state's 4 electoral votes by a wide 42.71% margin of victory. This is the most recent time a Democrat would win more than 70% of the vote in any state in a presidential race, as well as the last time any state gave a candidate over 70% of the vote.

Caucuses

Democratic

Republican

The 2012 Hawaii Republican caucuses took place on March 13, 2012.

Certified results doesn't include 858 outstanding votes (write-ins and provisional ballots).

General election

Candidate ballot access
 Mitt Romney/Paul Ryan, Republican
 Barack Obama/Joseph Biden, Democratic
 Gary Johnson/James P. Gray, Libertarian
 Jill Stein/Cheri Honkala, Green

Results

By county

Results by congressional district
Obama won both congressional districts.

See also 
2012 Republican Party presidential debates and forums
2012 Republican Party presidential primaries
 Results of the 2012 Republican Party presidential primaries
 Hawaii Republican Party

References

External links
The Green Papers: for Hawaii
The Green Papers: Major state elections in chronological order

2012
United States president
Hawaii